Roy Edwin Marshall (25 April 1930 – 27 October 1992) was a West Indian cricketer who played in four Test matchess from 1951 to 1952. He was a Wisden Cricketer of the Year in 1959.

Early career
The son of a wealthy plantation owner, Marshall was born in Farmers Plantation, Saint Thomas, Barbados and made his first-class debut for Barbados in 1946 when only 15. He toured England with the West Indies in 1950, making 1,117 runs at an average just short of 40 runs per innings, though he did not play in any of the Tests.

Move to England
Marshall made his Test debut against Australia on 9 November 1951 at the Gabba, making 28 and 30. After three further Tests against Australia and New Zealand, Marshall was omitted from the West Indian side and moved to England in 1953 to qualify for Hampshire.

He played for Hampshire from 1953 to 1972, qualifying for Championship matches in 1955, and captained them from 1966 to 1970. Marshall was an important component of Hampshire's 1961 Championship-winning side. He was an attacking opening batsman at a time when these were rare in county cricket. He scored over 1,000 runs in 17 of his 18 full county seasons and made 60 centuries for Hampshire. His best season was 1961 when he scored 2,607 runs. Marshall played 504 first-class matches for Hampshire, scoring 30,303 runs in his time with the county.

Marshall died from cancer at Taunton, Somerset, on 27 October 1992.

Family
His brother, Norman Marshall played a single Test for the West Indies in 1955. He also played first-class cricket for Barbados and Trinidad and Tobago.

References

External links
 
Profile of Roy Marshall by Gideon Haigh

1930 births
1992 deaths
West Indies Test cricketers
Barbadian cricketers
Barbados cricketers
Hampshire cricketers
Hampshire cricket captains
Commonwealth XI cricketers
International Cavaliers cricketers
Wisden Cricketers of the Year
Deaths from cancer in England
Players cricketers
People educated at The Lodge School, Barbados
Marylebone Cricket Club cricketers
People from Saint Thomas, Barbados
North v South cricketers
T. N. Pearce's XI cricketers